Richard Roberts (31 May 1874 – 10 April 1945) was a Canadian Christian theologian and author expounding the social responsibilities of the Christian conscience. He was “one of the most influential pacifists in Canada during the interwar years”.

With the outbreak of World War I, Roberts joined with Henry Hodgkin and others to launch the Fellowship of Reconciliation and he served as its first secretary. In part to help spread the organization to America, he emigrated from the United Kingdom to the United States in 1917. In New York City he joined Reinhold Niebuhr and Kirby Page on the editorial board of The World Tomorrow. He acted as a liaison between British and American pacifists throughout the war.

In 1922, Roberts emigrated to Montreal where in 1926 he wrote The Christian and War, “the definitive Canadian pacificist statement of the period”. Soon afterwards he moved to Toronto where he established a new chapter of the Fellowship of Reconciliation at Sherbourne Street United Church. In the early 1930s, Roberts drafted the United Church of Canada’s endorsement of the World Disarmament Conference.

References

Canadian Christian pacifists
Canadian anti-war activists
Alumni of Aberystwyth University
1874 births
1945 deaths
People from Blaenau Ffestiniog